Bieniów refers to the following places in Poland:

 Bieniów, Lublin Voivodeship
 Bieniów, Lubusz Voivodeship